Wahlberg's eagle (Hieraaetus wahlbergi) is a bird of prey that is native to sub-Saharan Africa, where it is a seasonal migrant in the woodlands and savannas.
It is named after the Swedish naturalist Johan August Wahlberg. Like all eagles, it belongs to the family Accipitridae.

Description

Wahlberg's eagle is a medium-sized raptor, and the sexes are similar. The head has a small crest, and the legs are yellow. The plumage tone is variable but may be dark brown except for dark-streaked grey undersides to the flight feathers, and a barred grey undertail. Light and dark plumage phases occur. A pale variant may be much lighter brown with whitish, rather than grey undertail and flight feather undersides. The pale variant is much less common than the darker variant.

Distribution and habitat 
Wahlberg's eagle is distributed from central Chad to the north-east coast of South Africa. Its western boundary is thought to be Cameroon, although it most commonly occurs further east across the continent.

Wahlberg's eagles cover large distances in short periods.

Behaviour and ecology
Wahlberg's eagle mainly hunts birds (including other raptors such as the Gabar goshawk and Barn owl), although it also feeds on reptiles (various lizards and snakes) and a few small mammals (Tree squirrels, Mongooses, Hares). It has also been recorded eating various Invertebrates such as termites, grasshoppers and beetles.

Wahlberg's eagle breeds mainly in southern Africa during the winter months. It builds a stick nest in the fork of a tree or the crown of a palm tree. Wahlberg's eagles are monogamous and form long-term pair bonds. They are well known for complex and spectacular aerial courtship displays. They are very territorial and solitary nesters. The nest is often reused by the same pair through multiple years. Their breeding season occurs during the wet season of northern South Africa from October to February as food is more readily available. The female feeds the chicks with food provided by the male eagle.
Reductions in reproductive output were observed in the 1990s, which were thought to be related to increased population density in Wahlberg's eagles; breeding success was highly density dependant, and resource availability did not play a part in this phenomenon.

Taxonomy

Studies of marker gene sequences (published 2004–2005) found Wahlberg's eagle belonged to a clade containing Hieraaetus pennatus, H. morphnoides, H. ayeresii, and H. (m.) weiskei.
Since then, many taxonomic checklists changed from Aquila wahlbergi to Hieraaetus wahlbergi.  However, the African Bird Club (as of the 2012 checklist) and the Second Southern African Bird Atlas Project (as of 2014) continue to keep Aquila wahlbergi separate from the Hieraaetus species.

References

 Birds of The Gambia by Barlow, Wacher and Disley,

External links
 Wahlberg's eagle - Species text in The Atlas of Southern African Birds

Wahlberg's eagle
Wahlberg's eagle
Birds of prey of Sub-Saharan Africa
Wahlberg's eagle
Birds of East Africa